The 1892 Grand National was the 54th renewal of the Grand National horse race that took place at Aintree near Liverpool, England, on 20 March 1892.

Finishing Order

Non-finishers

References

 1892
Grand National
Grand National
19th century in Lancashire